A three-point field goal (also known as a "three-pointer" or "3-pointer") is a field goal in a basketball game, made from beyond the three-point line, a designated arc radiating from the basket. A successful attempt is worth three points, in contrast to the two points awarded for shots made inside the three-point line. The statistic was first recognized in the 1986–87 season when 3-point field goals were officially instituted by the NCAA. The women's line remained at 20 ft 9 in until being moved to the FIBA distance in 2021–22.

The all-time leader in three-point field goals made and attempts is Antoine Davis of Detroit Mercy, who made 588 threes in 1,566 attempts. Only one player in the top 25 all-time earned his way onto this list in only three seasons: Stephen Curry of Davidson played from 2006–07 through 2008–09 but left for the National Basketball Association (NBA) after his junior season. Curry also played in the fewest games (104) out of all of the other players in the top 25 and currently ranks 18th all-time.

Three players split their collegiate careers at two schools apiece, and one player split his career between three programs. Keith Veney, who made 409 threes, first played at Lamar before transferring to Marshall; Akeem Richmond (416) started at Rhode Island before transferring to East Carolina; and Andrew Rowsey (404) played two seasons apiece at UNC Asheville and Marquette. Umoja Gibson, meanwhile, started at North Texas before transferring to Oklahoma and later to DePaul. The player with the highest three-point percentage for his career on this list is Fletcher Magee of Wofford at 43.5%. Gerry McNamara of Syracuse has the lowest (35.4%).

Among the current career leaders, five have played in more than four seasons—Davis, Kevin Foster, and Darius McGhee each played in five seasons, and Jordan Bohannon and Gibson each played in six. Normally, the only way for a player to play in more than four NCAA seasons is to qualify for a "medical redshirt", officially known by the NCAA as a "hardship waiver". To be eligible, a player must have participated in fewer than 30% of his team's games in that season, and cannot have participated in any games in the second half of the season. Also, the NCAA ruled that the 2020–21 season, seriously disrupted by COVID-19, would not count against any player's period of eligibility. Foster benefited from the hardship waiver, Davis and McGhee from the COVID-19 waiver, and Bohannon and Gibson from both waivers.

Key

Top 25 3-point field goal leaders

Includes tie for 25th.

Footnotes

References
General

Specific

NCAA Division I men's basketball statistical leaders